The  is a botanical garden located on Mount Rokkō, Kobe, Japan. It is open daily in the warmer months, except some Thursdays; an admission fee is charged.

The garden was established in 1933 at an altitude of 865 meters near the peak of Mount Rokkō. It currently contains about 1,500 kinds of alpine plants from Japan and the Himalayas, including dicentra, edelweiss, skunk cabbage, and native wild plants.

See also 

 Kobe Municipal Arboretum (nearby)
 List of botanical gardens in Japan

References 

 Kobe City Info
 BGCI entry
 Feel Kobe sightseeing article

Botanical gardens in Japan
Gardens in Hyōgo Prefecture
Geography of Kobe
Tourist attractions in Kobe